Nový Kostel is a municipality and village in Cheb District in the Karlovy Vary Region of the Czech Republic. It has about 500 inhabitants.

Administrative parts
Villages of Božetín, Čižebná, Horka, Hrzín, Kopanina, Mlýnek and Spálená are administrative parts of Nový Kostel.

References

Villages in Cheb District